The National Agriculture and Trade Show (NATS) which was established in the year 1970, is an annual public event that is held in Belmopan city which is the capital of Belize. It is a family oriented event created in order for farmers as well as numerous businesses and organizations to showcase and sell their products to the Belizean public. Approximately 40,000 to 45,000 individuals visit the Trade Show over the three days that it is held for.

History 
The first Agriculture Show was first held in Belize City on April 2 and 3, 1937. The following are some of the earlier records of when the NATS was held.

What is the Trade Show all about 
Love FM's main stage is always the main event of the day where Belize's leading band, the Gilharry 7 from Corozal Town would perform alongside other Belizean artists such as Supa G, Harlem Youths, Vida and Sheldon, Chico Ramos as well as the Sweet Pain band.

Apart from the entertainment, drinks and products, there are a variety of food from all parts of Belize, Mexico and Guatemala that are readily available to the visitors throughout the day. Some of these foods range from Tamales and Tacos to Rice and Beans with Stew Chicken and Barbecue. There are numerous mechanical rides that are brought in from the neighboring country Guatemala such as Ferris wheels and games of fortune for the young and old to enjoy. The attractions of the show include: 
 Judging of crops and livestock displays
 Judging of commercial and industrial display booths
 Tractor operation contest
 Coconut husking contest
 Aerial spraying display
 Selection of Miss Agriculture
 Musical Entertainment by local musicians/groups
 Horse riding
 Honoring of Farmer of the Year
 Rodeo
 Dog Show
 Canoe Race
 Motocross Show

Importance of the National Agriculture and Trade Show 
With Agriculture being one of the most profitable industries in Belize, The National Agriculture and Trade Show (NATS) focuses on the importance of agriculture through education, by demonstrating how the agricultural sector contributes to Belize's economy. The National Agriculture and Trade Show (NATS) also emphasizes the importance of food security. This event usually occurs near the end of April or on the first weekend of May.

References

Economy of Belize
Agriculture in Belize
Belmopan
Agricultural shows